Daniel Jubb (born 1984 in Manchester, England) is a British rocket scientist. In a 17 November 2008 article from the British newspaper The Times, he was named "one of the world's leading rocket scientists", by the Royal Air Force Wing Commander Andy Green.

Biography
Having been interested in rockets since childhood, Jubb had obtained corporate financing and flew many amateur rockets, all by the time he was 14 years old.

In 1995, and along with his grandfather Sid Guy, he co-founded The Falcon Project, a company that designs and develops rocket engines for commercial and military applications. At that time, Jubb obtained permission from the UK Ministry of Defence to launch rockets from the missile test platform of the Otterburn Army Training Estate in Northumberland  and after his rockets reached the maximum allowable launch height of 20,000 feet he wanted to go higher. The operations of The Falcon Project were then moved to a location near Garlock in the Mojave Desert in California. Jubb runs The Falcon Project from a home office in his parents' house and the company supplies the MOD, United States military, and plans to build satellite launch vehicles. In a short documentary produced in 1998 for Channel 4 titled Raw Talent: The Rocket Scientist, Jubb stated that he built his first rocket at age five, "from a McDonald's straw, a light-bulb holder and some household ingredients".

Although many media claims have been made about the altitudes reached by Jubb's rockets, none have appeared on the list of altitude records held by the United Kingdom Rocketry Association.

In November 2005, Jubb joined the Bloodhound SSC project. The Bloodhound is a jet and rocket powered car that was designed to break the land speed record by traveling at approximately 1,000 miles per hour (1,609 km/h). Jubb and The Falcon Project designed, built, and repeatedly tested their hybrid rocket engine that will produce an estimated 25,000 lbs of thrust, suitable for either Bloodhound SSC or Virgin Galactic's SpaceShip Two. In addition, The Falcon Project Ltd completed and tested a full scale monopropellant thruster for sub-sonic testing of the vehicle. On 28 November 2010 Neil Armstrong visited the Bloodhound SSC headquarters and chatted with the team, including Jubb. This 3 October 2012 report was televised on the Bloodhound SSC hybrid rocket fabricated by The Falcon Project Ltd with Daniel Jubb as director, which was successfully tested in public at Newquay, GB. Due to escalating costs caused by control system delays, the hybrid rocket for Bloodhound will instead be developed by Nammo.

On 10 June 2015, Jubb visited Stokesley School and spoke with Year 10 students extensively about Rocket Science and assisted them in fitting their own rockets with motors, which was a great success.

Jubb has also been noted for his prominent moustache which earned him recognition from The Chap magazine.

See also
 United Kingdom Aerospace Youth Rocketry Challenge
 Roy Dommett

References

External links
 Daniel Jubb - Falcon Project (Rocket Engines) - Daniel Jubb's profile on the Bloodhound SSC official project site

Rocket scientists
British space scientists
English aerospace engineers
1984 births
Living people
Scientists from Manchester